Bass Trail refers to a pair of hiking trails in Grand Canyon National Park:
North Bass Trail, accessible from the north rim
South Bass Trail, accessible from the south rim

See also
List of trails in Grand Canyon National Park